Piani di Praglia is a mountain in Liguria, northern Italy, part of the Ligurian Apennines.

Hiking 
The mountain is also accessible by off-road mountain paths and is crossed by the Alta Via dei Monti Liguri, a long-distance trail from Ventimiglia (province of Imperia) to Bolano (province of La Spezia).

Nature conservation 
The mountain and its surrounding area are part of a SIC (Site of Community Importance) called Praglia – Pracaban – M. Leco – P. Martin  (code: IT1331501).

References

Mountains of Liguria
Natura 2000 in Italy
Mountains under 1000 metres
Mountains of the Apennines